Amasra Coal Mine is a coal mine in Turkey located in Amasra, Bartın Province. It is operated by Amasra Taşkömürü İşletme Müessesesi̇, which is part of state-owned Turkish Hard Coal Enterprises (TTK).. 125,000 tonnes of coal was mined in 2021, which was less than any of the other four TTK owned mines in Zonguldak coal field: Armutçuk, Kozlu, Üzülmez and Karadon. 

On 14 October 2022, an explosion in the mine killed 41 people and wounded eleven more.

References

External links 

Amasra mine on Global Energy Monitor

Coal mines in Turkey
Amasra District
Bartın Province